The Electoral (Amendment) (Dáil Constituencies) Act 2017 (No. 39) is a law of Ireland which revised Dáil constituencies. It took effect on the dissolution of the 32nd Dáil on 14 January 2020 and a general election for the 33rd Dáil on the revised constituencies took place on 8 February 2020.

Following the 2016 census, the Minister for the Environment, Community and Local Government established an independent Constituency Commission under terms of the Electoral Act 1997. The commission was chaired by Robert Haughton, judge of the High Court, and delivered its report in June 2017. It proposed several changes to Dáil constituencies, increasing the number of seats in the Dáil from 158 to 160, while the number of constituencies were reduced by 1 to 39.

The Act implemented the recommendations of this report and repealed the Electoral (Amendment) (Dáil Constituencies) Act 2013, which had defined the constituencies used since the 2016 general election. It increased the range for future revisions by the Constituency Commission of Dáil constituencies from between 153 and 160 TDs in 2011 legislation, to between 166 and 172 TDs.

Revised constituencies

Change in seats
This table summarises the changes in representation but does not address revisions to the boundaries of constituencies.

Constituencies abolished

New constituencies

References

2017 in Irish law
Acts of the Oireachtas of the 2010s
Electoral Acts (Ireland)
2020 Irish general election